Nogometni klub Ljutomer, commonly referred to as NK Ljutomer or simply Ljutomer, is a Slovenian football club based in the town of Ljutomer. The club was established in 1975.

Honours
Slovenian Fourth Division
 Winners: 2003–04, 2021–22

League history since 1991

References

External links
Official website 

Association football clubs established in 1975
Football clubs in Slovenia
1975 establishments in Slovenia